Abraxas suspecta is a species of moth belonging to the family Geometridae. It was described by William Warren in 1894. It is known from China.

There are four generations per year.

The larvae feed on Euonymus japonicus. The species overwinters as a pupa.

References

Abraxini
Moths of Asia
Moths described in 1894